Damned or The Damned may refer to:

 Damnation, a concept of divine punishment and torment, and use of the term as a profanity

In print 
 The Damned (novel), by French author Joris-Karl Huysmans originally published as Là-Bas in 1891
 The Damned, a 1952 novel by John D. MacDonald, 1952 
 The Damned, a 1983 book by Linda Hoy
 The Damned Trilogy, a series of books by Alan Dean Foster published between 1991 and 1993
 Damned, a 2011 book by Nancy Holder
 Damned (novel), by Chuck Palahniuk, 2011
 Damned (comics), a 1997 limited series from Image Comics by Mike Zeck
 The Damned (comics), a limited series and later ongoing series from Oni Press, 2006–2007, 2017

Film 
 The Damned (1947 film), (Les Maudits), a French drama
 The Damned (1963 film), also known as These Are the Damned, a British science fiction film
 The Damned (1969 film) (La caduta degli dei), a film by Luchino Visconti
 The Damned (2002 film) (Zatracení), a Svátek
 Damned!, a film by James S. Murray 
 Damned – The Strange World of José Mojica Marins (Maldito - O Estranho Mundo de José Mojica Marins), a 2001 Brazilian documentary film
 Damned (2007 film), a film starring Tom Budge
 The Damned (2009 film), a Spanish drama film
 The Damned (2013 film), also known as Gallows Hill, a Spanish horror film by Víctor García

Television 
 Damned (TV series), a British television series
 "The Damned" (South Park), an episode
 "The Damned" (The Walking Dead), an episode

Music 
 The Damned (band), a British punk rock group
 Damned (album), a 2012 album by Wolfbrigade
 The Damned (album), a 2003 album by The Dead C
 "Damned" (song), a song by Eva Avila
 "Damned", a song by AC/DC from Stiff Upper Lip
 "Damned", a song by Bon Jovi from These Days
 "The Damned", a song by Plasmatics from Coup d'etat
 "The Damned", a song by Sharon Needles from Taxidermy

See also
 Abdul Hamid II (1842–1918), Ottoman Empire sultan called "Abdul the Damned" for the massacres of Armenians and others during his reign
 The Beautiful and Damned, F. Scott Fitzgerald's second novel
 Goddamned (album), a 2008 album by Jay Brannan
Dammed, a 2020 book by Brittany Luby
 Damn (disambiguation)
 Damnation (disambiguation)